John Noble (born 20 August 1948) is an Australian actor. He is known for his roles as Denethor in the Lord of the Rings film trilogy, Dr. Walter Bishop on the science fiction series Fringe, Henry Parrish on the action-horror series Sleepy Hollow, and Morland Holmes on the police procedural Elementary. Noble has also done voice work as Leland Monroe in the video game L.A. Noire, Unicron in the animated series Transformers: Prime, and Scarecrow in the DC Comics video game Batman: Arkham Knight.

Career
Noble early acting career started in theater throughout the 1970s and 1980s. For 10 years he was artistic director for the Stage Company of South Australia. Noble was a Trustee of the Adelaide Festival Centre and chairman of the Adelaide Festival of the Arts.  In 1979, he starred in Errol Flynn's Great Big Adventure Book for Boys at the Edinburgh Festival in Scotland. In 1984, Noble received a nomination by South Australian Premier John Bannon, for Young Australian of the Year award. 

Noble aged 40, made his film debut in the 1988 horror movie The Dreaming. 

He made occasional appearances on the television series All Saints. He is internationally known for his performance as Denethor in The Lord of the Rings trilogy. He played Russian Consul Anatoly Markov in the sixth season of the US television series 24. In 2011, he appeared as Real Estate tycoon Leland Monroe in Rockstar's video game L.A. Noire. He is also the voice of Unicron for the television show Transformers: Prime and its conclusion TV film.

He won awards when starring as eccentic scientist Walter Bishop in the television series Fringe for 5 seasons (2008-2013).
Noble played Morland Holmes, father of Sherlock Holmes, in Elementary. He was a series regular for season 4 with guest appearances in seasons 6 and 7.

John Noble later worked in Legends of Tomorrow where he voiced the time demon Mallus. In its episode "Guest Starring John Noble," he portrayed himself when Atom visited him on set of The Lord of the Rings: The Return of the King and had him record a fake rewrite which would be used to fool Nora Darhk.

Personal life
Noble divides his time between residences in New York City and Sydney, Australia, with wife Penny Noble. They have two children, now adults, Daniel Noble and actress Samantha Noble. In 2011, John Noble's hobbies were reported to be "music, painting, and narration". He studies theoretical physics and requested that the writers of Fringe always keep things grounded in what could be scientifically feasible.

In 2012, Noble was diagnosed with osteoporosis. His charity, Noble Bones, helps to raise awareness of the disease.

Filmography

Film

Television

Video games

Other work
 Artistic Director of Stage Company of South Australia 1977–1987
 Head of Drama, Brent St. School of Arts (Sydney) 1997–2000

Awards and nominations

References

External links

 

1948 births
20th-century Australian male actors
21st-century Australian male actors
Living people
People from Port Pirie
Australian male film actors
Australian theatre directors
Australian male television actors
Australian male video game actors
Australian male voice actors
Male actors from South Australia
Australian expatriate male actors in the United States
Outstanding Performance by a Cast in a Motion Picture Screen Actors Guild Award winners